Vasant Sarwate (Devanagari: वसंत सरवटे 3 February 1927 – 24 December 2016) was an Indian cartoonist and writer who was published primarily in Marathi publications during his lifetime.

He was born in Kolhapur on 3 February 1927. He was a professional civil engineer, and worked at Associated Cement Companies for most of his working life. He died in Mumbai on 24 December 2016.

Artistry

Sarwate started drawing cartoons from the age of seventeen. He wrote a number of books on his art, and collections of his work. (See Authorship.)

Sarwate's art was partly inspired by the cartoons in The New Yorker, particularly those of Saul Steinberg.

Apart from cartoons, Sarwate illustrated books of many notable Marathi writers like P L Deshpande, Vijay Tendulkar and Vinda Karandikar.

He also illustrated satirist Jaywant Dalvi's monthly columns Thanthanpal for Marathi magazine Lalit. He created covers of all Diwali issues of Lalit since its inception in 1965 to 2014.

He helped many young artists establish themselves in the world of cartoons.

He  received a Lifetime Achievement Award from the Indian Institute of Cartoonists in May 2009.

Sarwate lived in Vile Parle, Mumbai.

Authorship

 Samvad Reshalekhakashi, Mauj Prakashan, 2012 
 Reshalekhak Vasant Sarwate, Rajhans Prakashan, 2009 
 Sarwottam Sarwate, Lokawangmay Griha, 2008 
 Khel Chalu Rahila Pahije!, Mauj Prakashan, 2004 
 Khel Reshawatari, Mauj Prakashan, 2004 
Sawadhan! Pudhe Walan Ahe!, Mauj Prakashan, 1990 
 Khada Marayacha Jhala Tar…!, Mauj Prakashan, 1963 
 Wyang Chitra - Ek Samvad (jointly with Madhukar Dharmapurikar), Anubhav Prakashan, 2001
 Sahaprawasi, Majestic Prakashan, 2005
 Wyangkala - Chitrakala, Majestic Prakashan, 2005
 Parki Chalan, Majestic Prakashan, 1989
 Pu. La. : Ek Sathawan (Edited by Jaywant Dalvi; illustrations by Vasant Sarwate)
 Niwadak Thanthanpal - 1 & 2 (By Jaywant Dalvi; illustrations by Vasant Sarwate)

 Niwadak Marathi Wyangachitra (Edited by Prashant Kulkarni)

References

External links
 Vasant Sarwate at Indiaart Gallery
 Vasant Sarwate page on the website of Indian Institute of Cartoonists

 A report on exhibition of Sarwate’s art
 Visit http://searchingforlaugh.blogspot.com/ to see a few of his cartoons or click Vasant Sarwate
 Vasant Sarwate Dies

1927 births
2016 deaths
Indian cartoonists
Marathi people
People from Kolhapur
People from Mumbai Suburban district
Indian art critics
Writers from Maharashtra